The film score for Sex and the City was composed by Aaron Zigman and recorded with a large ensemble of the Hollywood Studio Symphony at the Newman Stage at 20th Century Fox in April 2008. The soundtrack to the film also features original and traditional songs and compositions. Two soundtracks were released in 2008.

Sex and the City: Original Motion Picture Soundtrack

The first soundtrack to Sex and the City was released on May 26, 2008, in the United Kingdom and on May 27 in the United States.

The soundtrack debuted at number two on the Billboard 200 with 66,000 copies sold in its first week, the highest debut for a multi-artist theatrical film soundtrack since 2005's Get Rich or Die Tryin'.

Track listing

Notes
  signifies a vocal producer
  signifies a main and vocal producer
  signifies a remixer
  signifies an additional producer
 "Mercy" does not appear on the US release of the soundtrack.

Sample credits
 "Labels or Love" contains an interpolation of "Sex and the City Theme" by Douglas Cuomo.

Charts

Weekly charts

Year-end charts

Certifications

Release history

Sex and the City: Volume 2

Sex and the City: Volume 2 is the follow-up album to Sex and the City: Original Motion Picture Soundtrack soundtrack. It was released on September 22, 2008, in the United Kingdom and on September 23, 2008, in the United States, followed by a worldwide release the following weeks.

Track listing

Notes
  signifies a vocal producer

Sample credits
 "Real Girl" contains excerpts from "It Ain't Over 'til It's Over" by Lenny Kravitz

Charts

Release history

References

2008 soundtrack albums
Albums produced by Buddy Miller
Albums produced by Cason Cooley
Albums produced by Gil Norton
Albums produced by Greg Kurstin
Albums produced by Jack Splash
Albums produced by Jermaine Dupri
Albums produced by Lester Mendez
Albums produced by Manuel Seal
Albums produced by Rick Rubin
Albums produced by Rico Love
Albums produced by Salaam Remi
Albums produced by Shep Goodman
Albums produced by Stargate
Albums produced by Steve Booker (producer)
Albums produced by Willie Mitchell (musician)
New Line Records soundtracks
Sex and the City
Comedy film soundtracks
Romance film soundtracks